Black Radio Won't Play This Record is an album by the American rock band Mother's Finest, released in 1992. The title of the album comes from a comment made by a Scotti Brothers executive.

Production
Three original members of Mother's Finest played on the album: Joyce Kennedy, Glenn Murdock, and Jerry Seay. It was produced by Thom Panunzio.

Critical reception
The Washington Post wrote that "lead singer Joyce Kennedy wastes no time bemoaning lack of black fan support for black rockers, singing in the first song, 'Negro': 'Like a rebel without a cause/ I play my music to no applause'." Spin called the album "loud, irreverent, and oozing integrity," writing that it "dishes out a Chaka-Khan-meets-alternametal onslaught." The Indianapolis Star deemed it "unadulterated hard rock," declaring that the band "manages to rage pretty effectively against racial and sexual stereotypes with an infectious metallic beat." 

AllMusic wrote: "Taking off the gloves (both musically and lyrically) and throwing urban contemporary considerations to the wind, MF excels by doing what it does best: scorching heavy metal and hard rock with a touch of Ike & Tina Turner-ish soul." Washington City Paper declared that "Kennedy’s voice is bred for the band’s ability to go from downtempo soul all the way up to power metal sprinkled with funk influences." Miami New Times called Black Radio Won't Play This Record "one of the best rock albums of the Nineties."

Track listing

References

Mother's Finest albums
1992 albums
Scotti Brothers Records albums